Randall is a town in Kenosha County, Wisconsin, United States. The population was 3,285 at the 2020 census. The unincorporated community of Bassett and census-designated place of Powers Lake are located in Randall, and the town surrounds the village of Twin Lakes, a separate municipality.

History
The first settler in Randall was Daniel T. Eldredge, who located on Mound Prairie in Randall in the autumn of 1836.

Geography

Demographics

As of the census of 2000, there were 2,929 people, 1,031 households, and 830 families residing in the town. The racial makeup of the town was 97.88% White, 0.31% African American, 0.07% Native American, 0.27% Asian, 0.24% from other races, and 1.23% from two or more races. Hispanic or Latino of any race were 2.29% of the population.

There were 1,031 households, out of which 39.9% had children under the age of 18 living with them, 69.5% were married couples living together, 7.9% had a female householder with no husband present, and 19.4% were non-families. 15.1% of all households were made up of individuals, and 6.3% had someone living alone who was 65 years of age or older. The average household size was 2.84 and the average family size was 3.15.

In the town, the population was spread out, with 28.0% under the age of 18, 5.9% from 18 to 24, 29.9% from 25 to 44, 24.6% from 45 to 64, and 11.5% who were 65 years of age or older. The median age was 38 years. For every 100 females, there were 101.6 males. For every 100 females age 18 and over, there were 98.8 males.

The median income for a household in the town was $63,063, and the median income for a family was $65,094. Males had a median income of $46,017 versus $28,309 for females. The per capita income for the town was $22,000. About 2.6% of families and 3.9% of the population were below the poverty line, including 2.6% of those under age 18 and 1.9% of those age 65 or over.

Notable people
George H. Kroncke, Wisconsin state representative
John F. Reynolds, Wisconsin state representative and senator

References

External links
Town of Randall official website

Towns in Kenosha County, Wisconsin
Populated places in Kenosha County, Wisconsin
Towns in Wisconsin